The Little Pet is a 1934 Czech comedy film directed by Martin Frič.

Cast
 Hugo Haas as Dr. Alois Pech, a prison librarian
 Adina Mandlová as Marcella Johnová
 František Kreuzmann as Pospísil
 Helena Bušová
 Jan Marek as Beggar
 Jaroslav Marvan
 Stanislav Neumann
 Antonín Novotný
 Ema Pechová
 Václav Trégl
 Rudolf Žák as Card-player

References

External links
 

1934 films
1934 comedy films
1930s Czech-language films
Czechoslovak black-and-white films
Films directed by Martin Frič
Compositions by Pavel Haas
Czechoslovak comedy films
1930s Czech films